Recurrence Index (RI) in genomics denotes the number of mutations per kilobase of a given genomic locus of a patient carrying particular mutations. RI represents a patient level recurrence frequency estimated for somatic mutations.

References

Genomics